This is a list of lakes of Saskatchewan, a province of Canada. The largest and most notable lakes are listed at the start, followed by an alphabetical listing of other lakes of the province.

Larger lake statistics 
"The total area of a lake includes the area of islands. Lakes lying across provincial boundaries are listed in the province with the greater lake area."

A

B

C

D

E

F

G

H

I

J

K

L

M

N

O

P

Q

R

S

T

U

V

W

Y

Z

See also 
List of lakes of Canada
List of rivers of Saskatchewan
Geography of Saskatchewan
List of dams and reservoirs in Canada

References 

Lakes
Saskatchewan